The following is a list of the 52 municipalities (comuni) of the Province of Isernia, Molise, Italy.

List

See also
List of municipalities of Italy

References

Isernia